David Prophet (9 October 1937 – 29 March 1981) was a British racing driver from England.  He participated in two Formula One World Championship Grands Prix, debuting on 28 December 1963.  He scored no championship points. He finished sixth in the non-Championship 1963 Rand Grand Prix.

Prophet was killed in a helicopter crash shortly after taking off from Silverstone Circuit on 29 March 1981. With him was Christopher Roberts.

Racing record

Complete Formula One World Championship results
(key)

Non-Championship Formula One results
(key)

Complete British Saloon Car Championship results
(key) (Races in bold indicate pole position; races in italics indicate fastest lap.)

References

 "The Formula One Record Book", John Thompson, 1974.

English racing drivers
English Formula One drivers
1937 births
1981 deaths
World Sportscar Championship drivers
Hong Kong motorsport people

12 Hours of Reims drivers